The 1980 Cronulla-Sutherland Sharks season was the fourteenth in the club's history. They competed in the NSWRFL's 1980 Premiership as well as the 1980 Tooth Cup.

Ladder

References

Cronulla-Sutherland Sharks seasons
Cronulla-Sutherland Sharks season
Cronulla-Sutherland Sharks season